Félix de Almeida Mendonça (23 March 1928 – 26 June 2020), better known simply as Félix Mendonça, was a Brazilian politician and engineer from the state of Bahia.

Career
Before pursuing a career in politics, Mendonça studied Civil engineering at the Federal University of Bahia between 1951 and 1955.

Between 1963 and 1966, Mendonça held the post of mayor of Itabuna.

In 1966, he was elected member of the Legislative Assembly of Bahia. His tenure lasted from 1967 to 1971.

In 1982, he was elected member of the Chamber of Deputies from Bahia. His first term went from 1983 to 1987.

In 1986, he decided to run for a spot at the Brazilian Senate, but failed to secure enough votes to be elected.

In 1990, he was again elected Federal Deputy from Bahia. His second term went from 1991 to 1995.

In 1994, 1998, 2002 and 2006, he went on a four consecutive reelection streak.

In 2010, after six terms and almost twenty five years as a Federal Deputy, Mendonça decided to not run for reelection, effectively retiring from politics the following year after the end on his last term.

Personal life and death
Mendonça was married to Maria Helena Mendonça and had two daughters and one son.

His son, Félix Mendonça Júnior is also a politician currently on his third consecutive tenure as a Federal Deputy from Bahia.

On 26 June 2020, Mendonça died in Salvador at the age of 92 due to complications brought on by COVID-19 during the COVID-19 pandemic in Brazil.

References

1928 births
2020 deaths
People from Bahia
Democratic Labour Party (Brazil) politicians
National Democratic Union (Brazil) politicians
National Renewal Alliance politicians
Democratic Social Party politicians
Brazilian Labour Party (current) politicians
Democrats (Brazil) politicians
Members of the Chamber of Deputies (Brazil) from Bahia
Members of the Legislative Assembly of Bahia
Deaths from the COVID-19 pandemic in Bahia